The 2005 ICF Canoe Slalom World Championships were held in Penrith, New South Wales, Australia at the Penrith Whitewater Stadium under the auspices of International Canoe Federation. It was the 29th edition. This marked the first time the events took place on the Australian continent on the venue that hosted the slalom canoeing event for the 2000 Summer Olympics in neighboring Sydney.

Medal summary

Men's

Canoe

Kayak

Women's

Kayak

Medal table

References
Official results
International Canoe Federation

Canoe Slalom World Championships
World Canoe Slalom Championships
2005
International sports competitions hosted by Australia
Sports competitions in Sydney
Canoeing and kayaking competitions in Australia